Ivar Fredrik Lantto (15 August 1862 – 19 November 1938) was a Finnish schoolteacher, farmer and politician, born in Tornio. He was a member of the Parliament of Finland from 1908 to 1909 and from 1916 to 1919, representing the Agrarian League.

References

1862 births
1938 deaths
People from Tornio
People from Oulu Province (Grand Duchy of Finland)
Centre Party (Finland) politicians
Members of the Parliament of Finland (1908–09)
Members of the Parliament of Finland (1916–17)
Members of the Parliament of Finland (1917–19)
People of the Finnish Civil War (White side)
Finnish schoolteachers